Eucalyptus albens, known as the white box, is a common tree of the western slopes and plains of New South Wales and adjacent areas in Queensland and Victoria. It has rough, fibrous bark on the base of its trunk and smooth, white bark above. The leaves are lance-shaped and groups of seven spindle-shaped flower buds are arranged in leaf axils or on the ends of the branches. White flowers are mostly present between August and February and the fruit are barrel-shaped to urn-shaped.

Description
Its trunk may reach  diameter at breast height and has rough, fibrous, pale grey, sometimes tessellated bark to the base of its larger branches. The bark higher up is smooth and white and is shed annually in short ribbons. The flower buds are arranged on a branching inflorescence, each branch with groups of seven buds. The flowers are white and appear in the autumn from March to May.

Taxonomy and naming
Eucalyptus albens was first formally described in 1867 George Bentham in Flora Australiensis, from material collected in several locations, including by botanist and explorer, Allan Cunningham, along the "Macquarrie river". In 2009, Anthony Bean selected the material collected by Charles Stuart in the New England district of New South Wales as the lectotype. This eucalypt is related to grey box (E. moluccana) and inland grey box (E. microcarpa). Hybridization with grey box has been reported in the Hunter Valley. The specific epithet (albens) is a Latin word meaning "whitening". Both the epithet and common names are derived from the white deposits over the leaves and gumnuts, while the epithet "box" comes from the box-like tessellated pattern in the bark.

The Wiradjuri people of New South Wales use the name birri for the species.

Distribution and habitat
The white box is a tree of grassy eucalypt woodlands on plains or gently sloping areas from south-east Queensland to the western slopes of New South Wales and north-eastern Victoria extending as far south as Yea. Isolated populations occur in the Flinders Ranges and near Melrose South Australia.

It is associated with inland grey box, fuzzy box (E. conica), yellow box (E. melliodora), Pilliga grey box (E. pilligaensis), red ironbark (E. sideroxylon), narrow-leaved ironbark (E. crebra), Blakely's red gum (E. blakelyi), apple species (Angophora), black cypress (Callitris endlicheri), white cypress (Callitris glaucophylla), kurrajong (Brachychiton populneus) and wattles (Acacia) species.

Conservation
Eucalyptus albens is a component of the "WhiteBox Yellow Box Blakelys' Red Gum Woodland" commonly referred to as "Box-Gum Woodland" that is classed as "critically endangered" under the Australian Government Environment Protection and Biodiversity Conservation Act 1999 and as an "endangered ecological community" under the New South Wales Government Biodiversity Conservation Act 2016.

Uses
The heavy and hard wood is used for railway sleepers and fence posts. The flowers produce nectar for the honey industry.

References

Further reading

 

albens
Myrtales of Australia
Flora of New South Wales
Flora of Queensland
Flora of Victoria (Australia)
Flora of South Australia
Trees of Australia
Plants described in 1867
Taxa named by George Bentham